South Korea, as Korea, competed in the Winter Olympic Games for the first time as an independent nation at the 1948 Winter Olympics in St. Moritz, Switzerland.

Speed skating

References

Korea, South
1948
1948 in South Korean sport